Phebalium speciosum is a species of shrub that is endemic to a restricted area of New South Wales. It has branchlets covered with rust-coloured scales, lance-shaped to narrow elliptical leaves covered with silvery and rust-coloured scales, and umbels of white to pale pink flowers with silvery or rust-coloured scales on the back of the petals.

Description
The upper surface of the leaves is dark green with silvery scales and the lower surface is covered with silvery and rust-coloured scales. Flowering occurs from June to August or in February.

Taxonomy and naming
Phebalium speciosum was first formally described in 2013 by Ian Telford in the journal Telopea from specimens collected near Urbenville in 2007.

Distribution and habitat
This phebalium grows in open forest or heath at the base of volcanic outcrops and on top of cliffs. It is only known from two locations near Urbenville.

Conservation status
This species is listed as "critically endangered" under the Australian Government Environment Protection and Biodiversity Conservation Act 1999 and the New South Wales Government Biodiversity Conservation Act 2016. The main threats to the species include habitat loss and weed invasion.

References

speciosum
Flora of New South Wales
Plants described in 2013